{{DISPLAYTITLE:C17H16O9}}
The molecular formula C17H16O9 (molar mass: 364.30 g/mol, exact mass: 364.0794 u) may refer to:

 Quercitannic acid
 Bergaptol-O-beta-D-glucopyranoside

Molecular formulas